Samantha Nicole Marshall is an Antiguan MP and Cabinet Minister. Marshall had once represented St. Mary's South in the House of Representatives. She is a member of the Antigua and Barbuda Labour Party.

Career 
Marshall owns a law firm, Stapleton Chambers, located in St John’s. She is one of the nation's top attorneys.

Marshall won the St. Mary's South constituency in the 2014 general elections defeating Hilson Baptiste, a member of the United Progressive Party. Six days after the 2014 elections, she was appointed Minister of Social Transformation and Human Resource Development by Prime Minister Gaston Browne.

She won the same seat in the 2018 elections and was appointed Minister of Social Transformation, Human Resource, Youth, and Gender Affairs Department one day after the 2018 elections.

She became a senator on 23 January 2023, after losing her seat in the 2023 Antiguan general election.

References 

Year of birth missing (living people)
Living people
Antigua and Barbuda Labour Party politicians
Members of the House of Representatives (Antigua and Barbuda)
Government ministers of Antigua and Barbuda